Greg West (born June 13, 1985) is an American skeleton racer.

He participated at the IBSF World Championships 2019, winning a medal.

References

External links

1985 births
Living people
Sportspeople from Springfield, Missouri
American male skeleton racers
Baker University alumni